Chrono.Naut is an EP by the doom metal band Electric Wizard. It was originally released on LP in 1997 through Man's Ruin Records. It was then re-released on CD later that year as a split with Orange Goblin. The re-release features different artwork and the two songs bridged together.

An early version of the song was recorded by Jus Oborn's band Eternal, and appears on their demo Lucifer's Children (1993). The demo appears in full on the compilation album Pre-Electric Wizard 1989-1994.

Release
Chrono.Naut was released on October 10, 1997. "Chrono.Naut" was later released as the split single  Chrono.Naut/Nuclear Guru on Man's Ruin Records on March 8, 1998.

Track listing
 "Chrono.Naut" – 6:47
 "Chrono.Naut Phase II: Chaos Revealed" – 10:59

Personnel
 Jus Oborn - guitar, vocals
 Tim Bagshaw - bass
 Mark Greening - drums
 All Lyrics - Jus Oborn
 All Music - Electric Wizard

References

Electric Wizard EPs
1997 EPs
Man's Ruin Records EPs